Scotorythra brunnea is a moth of the family Geometridae. It was first described by William Warren in 1896. It is endemic to the Hawaiian islands of Kauai, Oahu, Molokai, Maui and Hawaii.

The wingspan is 40–45 mm.

Larvae have been reared from guava.

External links

brunnea
Endemic moths of Hawaii
Biota of Kauai
Biota of Maui
Biota of Oahu